Mark Joseph Assad (born June 14, 1940) is a Canadian politician who is a member of the Liberal Party of Canada. He was a member of the House of Commons of Canada representing Gatineau from 1997 to 2004, and represented Gatineau—La Lièvre from 1988 to 1997. He was born in Buckingham, Quebec and is an administrator, and a teacher. He served as the chair of the Standing Committee on Public Accounts. He did not run for re-election in 2004.

Other political experience
Assad was a Liberal Party of Quebec member of the National Assembly of Quebec from 1970 to 1976, and from 1981 to 1988.

Electoral record (partial)

References
 
 

1940 births
Living people
Liberal Party of Canada MPs
Members of the House of Commons of Canada from Quebec
Politicians from Gatineau
Quebec Liberal Party MNAs
21st-century Canadian politicians
Canadian politicians of Lebanese descent